Rəncbərlər (also, Randzhbarlar and Randzhbarlyar) is a village and municipality in the Aghjabadi Rayon of Azerbaijan.  It has a population of 2,062.

References 

Populated places in Aghjabadi District